Lanzinger is a surname. Notable people with the surname include:

 Günther Lanzinger (born 1972), Austrian ice hockey player
 Judith Ann Lanzinger (born 1946), American jurist
 Matthias Lanzinger (born 1980), Austrian alpine skier

German-language surnames